Urban Connection (released 2001 in Oslo, Norway by Bergland Production/Bare Bra Musikk – BE0032) is a jazz album by the Norwegian jazz band Urban Connection.

Critical reception 

Urban Connection played together for a long time before they released their self-titled debut album, and have established themselves as the best of the best in young Norwegian jazz both in Norway and internationally. Tomas Lauvland Pettersen in the Norwegian Jazz magazine «Ballade» states: "Their take on modern Konitzesque jazz is highly integral and utterly convincing on their third full-length outing ‘UC 3’. Bassist Raknes is not only able to swing and solo, he writes strong tunes with challenging harmonic and rhythmic twists that keep the listener on his toes throughout the recording".

The review by the Norwegian newspaper Dagbladet awarded the album 5 stars (dice).

Honors 
Spellemannprisen 2001 in the class Jazz

Track listing 
"Turban Collection" (3:31) – written by Steinar Raknes
"Passion Dance" (6:00) – written by McCoy Tyner
"No Fret Blue Z" (4:38) – written by Steinar Raknes
"Song For Everyone" (3:30) – written by Frode Nymo, Håkon Mjåset Johansen, Steinar Raknes
"Drivers Escape" (4:44) – written by Steinar Raknes
"Blue Span" (9:47) – written by Steinar Raknes
"Oblivion" (2:32) – written by Steinar Raknes

Personnel 
Alto Saxophone – Frode Nymo
Bass – Steinar Raknes
Drums – Håkon Mjåset Johansen

Credits 
Producer and engineer – Gunnar Andreas Berg
Engineer – Rune Holme
Mastering – Skansen Lydstudio
Recording – MIT-Studio
Cover – Per Finne

References

External links 
Frode Nymo on Myspace
Håkon Mjåset Johansen on Myspace
Steinar Raknes Official Website

Spellemannprisen winners
2001 albums
Urban Connection albums